Jackson County Airport  is a county-owned, public-use airport located six nautical miles (11 km) southwest of the central business district of Ravenswood, in Jackson County, West Virginia, United States.

Facilities and aircraft 
It has one runway designated 4/22 with an asphalt surface measuring 4,001 by 75 feet (1,220 x 23 m).

For the 12-month period ending July 6, 2009, the airport had 12,402 aircraft operations, an average of 33 per day: 97% general aviation, 2% military, and 1% air taxi, 
At that time there were 21 aircraft based at this airport: 90% single-engine, 5% multi-engine and 5% ultralight.

References

External links 
 Aerial photo as of 8 April 1994 from USGS The National Map
 
 

Airports in West Virginia
Buildings and structures in Jackson County, West Virginia
Transportation in Jackson County, West Virginia